Tanya Desai is an Indian actress and model. She is mainly known for her roles in Crackdown, Street Light, Godman and Zero Kilometre. She also acted as lead model in various music videos.

Early life 
Desai was born in Ghaziabad, Uttar Pradesh and brought up in Delhi. After her schooling from Gaziabad she shifted to Delhi for college. She started dance training in Delhi and she was also an instructor in the same institute.

Career 
Before starting her career as an actress in films and webseries she started as background dancer in films. Later, 
she did television shows like Crime Petrol, Crime Alert, CID, Dil Dosti Dance and Savdhan India. She also worked as a lead model in music videos like Rabb Wargeya, Yaar Di Jaago, Hot Jawani and Selfie.
In 2020,  Desai made his acting debut with the webseries Crackdown. In the same year she played a lead character Maya in Tamil webseries Godman.
In 2021, she acted as lead in film Street Light.
In the same year she acted in Zero Kilometre and got the Outstanding Achievement Award in World film Carnival Singapore Awards.
Her new web series Jaghanya Kuttey Ki Maut is released on Ullu App.

Filmography

Films

As a model 
Rabb Wargeya
Yaar Di Jaago
Hot Jawani
Selfie 
Bubbly

TV series 
 Crime Petrol
 Dil Dosti Dance
 CID 
 Crime Alert 
 Savdhan India

References 

Living people
Actresses in Hindi cinema
21st-century Indian actresses
Year of birth missing (living people)